Dragoljub Pljakić (August 28 1937 – June 28 2011), nicknamed "Pljaka", was a Serbian basketball player and coach.

Playing career 
Pljakić spent the major part of his playing career with Radnički from Belgrade, which played in the Yugoslav First Basketball League. During the 1959 season, he played for OKK Beograd.

Coaching career

Men's Basketball 
Pljakić coached Radnički Belgrade, Borac Čačak, Dinamo Pančevo, Metalac, OKK Beograd.

Women's Basketball 
Pljakić coached Crvena zvezda and Partizan.

Pljakić was a head coach of the Yugoslavia women's national team that placed 6th at the 1964 FIBA World Championship for Women.

Career achievements

Women's Basketball 
 Yugoslav League champion: 3  (with Crvena zvezda: 1972–73 and with Partizan: 1983–84, 1985–86)
 Yugoslav Cup winner: 2  (with Crvena zvezda: 1972–73, 1973–74)

Personal life 
Pljakić was married to Vukica Mitić, a basketball player. She played for ŽKK Crvena zvezda and represented the Yugoslavia national team internationally.

References

1937 births
2011 deaths
Basketball players from Belgrade
KK Borac Čačak coaches
KK Dinamo Pančevo coaches
KK Metalac coaches
OKK Beograd coaches
OKK Beograd players
BKK Radnički coaches
BKK Radnički players
Serbian men's basketball players
Serbian men's basketball coaches
Yugoslav men's basketball players
Yugoslav basketball coaches
ŽKK Partizan coaches
ŽKK Crvena zvezda coaches